George Paul Landow (b. 25 August 1940) is Professor of English and Art History Emeritus at Brown University. He is a leading authority on Victorian literature, art, and culture, as well as a pioneer in criticism and theory of Electronic literature, hypertext and hypermedia. He also pioneered the use of hypertext and the web in higher education.

Work
George Landow has published extensively on John Ruskin and the Pre-Raphaelite Brotherhood, specifically the life and works of William Holman Hunt.

Landow is also a leading theorist of hypertext, of the effects of digital technology on language, and of electronic media on literature. While his early work on hypertext sought to establish design rules for efficient hypertext communication, he is especially noted for his book Hypertext: The Convergence of Contemporary Literary Theory and Technology, first published in 1992, which is considered a "landmark" in the academic study of electronic writing systems, and states the view that the interpretive agenda of post-structuralist literary theory anticipated the essential characteristics of hypertext.

In Hypertext Landow draws on theorists such as Jacques Derrida, Roland Barthes, Gilles Deleuze, Paul de Man, and Michel Foucault, among others, and argues, especially, that hypertext embodies the textual openness championed by post-structuralist theory and that hypertext enables people to develop knowledge in a non-linear, non-sequential, associative way that linear texts do not.  Though he has been a consistent proponent of visual overviews and navigational maps, he has long argued that hypertext navigation is not a problem—that hypertexts are not more difficult to understand than linear texts.

Landow also pioneered the use of the web in higher education with projects such as  The Victorian Web, The Contemporary, Postcolonial, & Postimperial Literature in English web, and The Cyberspace, Hypertext, & Critical Theory web.

Select works
Hypertext 3.0 : Critical Theory and New Media in an Era of Globalization. Baltimore: Johns Hopkins University Press, 2006. 
Hypertext 2.0. Baltimore: Johns Hopkins University Press, 1997. 
Hypertext : The Convergence of Contemporary Critical Theory and Technology. Baltimore: Johns Hopkins University Press, 1992. 
Hyper/Text/Theory, 1994
 Hypermedia and Literary Studies, 1994 (with Paul Delany)
 The Digital Word: Text-Based Computing in the Humanities, 1993 (with Paul Delany)
 Elegant Jeremiahs: The Sage from Carlyle to Mailer, 1986
 A Pre-Raphaelite Friendship: The Correspondence of William Holman Hunt and John Lucas Tupper, 1986
 Ladies of Shalott: A Victorian Masterpiece and Its Contexts, 1985
 Images of Crisis: Literary Iconology, 1750 to the Present, 1982
 Victorian Types, Victorian Shadows; Biblical Typology in Victorian Literature, Art, and Thought, 1980
 Approaches to Victorian Autobiography, 1979
 William Holman Hunt and Typological Symbolism, 1979
 The Aesthetic and Critical Theories of John Ruskin, 1972

Honors
 Fulbright in Information Technology, Croatia, June 2011.
 Distinguished Visiting Professor, National University of Singapore, August 1998 - March 1999.
 National Endowment for the Humanities Summer Institute for College Teachers at Illinois State University (Project Director: Roger Tarr), 1998.
 Visiting Professor, University of Zimbabwe, August 1997.
 ACC Distinguished Lecturer in Computer Science, University of South Alabama, 1997.
 Visiting Research Fellow in Electronics and Computer Science, University of Southampton, 1995.
 British Academy Visiting Professor, Bowland College, University of Lancaster, 1994.
 Mellon Foundation Fresh Combinations Grant for a course in hypertext and literary theory, 1991-1992
 National Endowment for the Humanities Summer Institute for College Teachers at Yale University (Project Director: Duncan Robinson), 1991.
 EDUCOM/ENCRIPTAL Higher Education Software Award, Best Curriculum Innovation - Humanities, from National Center for Research to Improve Postsecondary Teaching and Learning, 1990.
 Faculty Fellow, Institute for Research in Information and Scholarship, 1989-1994
 National Endowment for the Humanities Summer Institute for College Teachers at Yale University (Project Director: Duncan Robinson), 1988.
 Annenberg/Corporation for Public Broadcasting Planning Grant, for The Continents of Knowledge, 1988.
 Annenberg/Corporation for Public Broadcasting Grant to develop educational software and course materials for the humanities, 1985–1987.
 National Endowment for the Arts Grant for Ladies of Shalott, 1984–1985. (Project Director)
 National Endowment for the Humanities Summer Stipend, 1984.
 Guggenheim Fellow, 1978
 Visiting Fellow, Brasenose College, Oxford, 1977
 National Endowment for the Humanities Project Development Grant, 1976.
 Phi Beta Kappa, 1974
 Guggenheim Fellow, 1973
 Gustave O. Arldt Award, Council of Graduate Schools in the United States, for a book in the humanities (for The Aesthetic and Critical Theories of John Ruskin), 1972
 Master of Arts Degree, Ad Eundum, Brown University, 1972
 Visiting Associate Professor, University of Chicago, 1970-1971
 Chamberlain Fellow, Columbia University, Summer 1969
 Fellow of the Society for the Humanities, Cornell University, 1968-1969
 Research Grant, Council on the Humanities, Columbia University, Summer 1968
 Fulbright Scholar, Birkbeck College, University of London, 1964-1965
 Class of 1873 Fellow in English Letters, Princeton University, 1962-1964
 Woodrow Wilson Fellow, Brandeis University, 1961-1962

See also
Espen Aarseth
Jay David Bolter
Robert Coover
J. Yellowlees Douglas
Electronic Literature Organization
N. Katherine Hayles
Shelley Jackson
Michael Joyce
Lev Manovich
Stuart Moulthrop

References

External links
 Official site
  Hypermedia: futures. Critic and new media in the globalization era a talk given by George Landow at the File festival Symposium/November/2005

1940 births
Living people
American literary critics
Postmodern theory
American non-fiction writers
Electronic literature critics
American academics of English literature
Brown University faculty